Swami Vivekananda (1863–1902) was an Indian Hindu monk and a key figure in the introduction of Indian philosophies of Vedanta and Yoga to the western world. He was one of the most influential philosophers and social reformers in his contemporary India and the most successful and influential missionaries of Vedanta to the Western world. Indian Nobel laureate poet Rabindranath Tagore's suggested to study the works of Vivekananda to understand India. He also told, in Vivekananda there was nothing negative, but everything positive.

In last one century, hundreds of scholarly books have been written on Vivekananda, his works and his philosophy in different languages. Sister Nivedita, who was a disciple and a friend of Vivekananda, wrote two books The Master as I Saw Him and Notes of some wanderings with the Swami Vivekananda. The first one was published in 1910 and the second one was published in 1913. Sister Gargi's lifelong research work, a series of six volumes of books, Swami Vivekananda in the West: New Discoveries was first published in two volumes in 1957. In 1983–87, these series was republished in six volumes. Bengali scholar and critic Sankari Prasad Basu, who was a director of Swami Vivekananda Archives, Ramakrishna Mission Institute of Culture wrote several books on Vivekananda such as Vivekananda o Samakalin Bharatbarsha ( 7 volumes), Sahasya Vivekananda , Bandhu Vivekananda , etc.

Monks of Ramakrishna Math and Mission too have written several notable books on the life and works of Vivekananda. Swami Vivekananda and Modern India written by Swami Jagadiswarananda was first published in 1941. In this book, the author covered the biography of Vivekananda in brief. Swami Nikhilananda wrote Vivekananda: A Biography which was first published in 1943 from Advaita Ashrama. Yuganayak Vivekananda , written by Swami Gambhirananda was first published in 1966–1967.

Books 
Published in his lifetime
 Karma Yoga (1896)
 Raja Yoga (1896)
 Vedanta Philosophy: An address before the Graduate Philosophical Society (first published 1896)
 Lectures from Colombo to Almora (1897)
 Vedanta philosophy: lectures on Jnana Yoga (1902)

Published posthumously
Here is a list of selected books of Swami Vivekananda published after his death (1902)
 Addresses on Bhakti Yoga
 Bhakti Yoga
 Complete works. Vol 5
 The East and the West
 Inspired Talks (1909)
 Narada Bhakti Sutras – translation
 Lectures from Colombo to Almora (1904)
 Para Bhakti or Supreme Devotion
 Practical Vedanta
 Jnana Yoga
 Raja Yoga (1920)
 Speeches and writings of Swami Vivekananda; a comprehensive collection
 Vivekavani (1986) – Telugu
 Yoga (1987) – Telugu
 A Bouquet of Swami Vivekananda's Writings (2013), handwritten works of Swami Vivekananda

Books on Swami Vivekananda

A–R

S

T–Z

See also 
 Bibliography of Ramakrishna
 Teachings and philosophy of Swami Vivekananda

References

Citations

Works cited

External links 
 Books on Swami Vivekananda in WorldCat
 Books on and by Swami Vivekananda from Advaita Ashrama

Swami Vivekananda
Vivekananda, Swami
Vivekananda, Swami
Neo-Vedanta